Shao Jiang can refer to:
 Jiang (rank)
 Shao Jiang, student leader during Tiananmen Square protests of 1989
 Shao-Jiang Min, a collection of dialects of Min Chinese
 Shaojiang, a village in Longkou, Xiangtan, Hunan